Travel Tou Ariki is a Cook Islands high chief (ariki) from Mitiaro.  He is currently Kaumaiti Nui (president) of the House of Ariki.

He served as President of the House of Ariki between 2002 and 2006, and again from 2008.  He was elected again in December 2009, and again in August 2019.

References

Cook Island Māori people
Living people
Year of birth missing (living people)
People from Mitiaro
Members of the House of Ariki
Royalty of the Cook Islands